Ida Standley   (19 January 1869 – 29 May 1948) was the first school teacher in Alice Springs, Australia. For 15 years, from 1914 to 1929, she worked at The Bungalow. Standley was appointed MBE for her services to children's welfare.

Early life 

Ida Standley was born Ida Woodcock on 19 January 1869 in Adelaide. She was one of the six children  of Hanson Woodcock, a butcher, and his wife Bertha. She was educated at Misses Lucy and Florence Tilley's Hardwicke House Ladies' College and, then became a governess to the Standley family at Mount Wudinna Station on the Eyre Peninsula. Here she met her 35 year old farmer husband, George Standley, who she married on 12 August 1887 when she was 18. The couple had four children together before their marriage ended; around 1903. During their marriage Ida became a teacher and worked in a handful of one-teacher schools.

In 1914 in South Australian Education Department advertised for a female teacher in Alice Springs, then Stuart, and no one applied until parents in the area agreed to provide additional support to the teacher to cover the cost of board and washing. With that  promise,  in May 1914, she made the difficult journey to Alice Springs by catching the train to Oodnadatta and then being escorted by police constable, Harry 'Trot' Kunoth (who would later marry Amelia Kunoth), and linesman, Will Fox, on a 14-day buggy journey the final 800 km.

Life in the Northern Territory 

Upon arrival in Alice Springs, for lack of other options Ida first stayed in the police house with Robert Stott and his family. The  school was established in a stone hut at the side of the Stuart Town Gaol.

From the beginning the European children were taught from 9:00 am to 12:30 pm and the 'half-caste' Aboriginal children, who lived at The Bungalow, from 3:00 pm to 4:30 pm. The Bungalow was established in 1914 and the children were under the care of Topsy Smith until, by early 1915, Ida was asked to provide additional supervision outside of the hours of tuition for a small additional sum.

Soon the additional funding promised by the parents started to break down with some parents being unable to pay and others leaving the district. There was, however, an element of racism involved with many parents and other community members that the 'Europeans' were contributing to her upkeep when the majority of her students were Aboriginal.

Standley and Smith worked together closely at the Bungalow, behind the Stuart Arms Hotel, for many years until, in November 1928, the school were moved out of town to what is now the Jay Creek Settlement. Interestingly during a period of time (1917 - 1921) that The Bungalow was located at the rear of the hotel the lease-holder was Vivian Rose Browne, Standley's youngest daughter, whose husband Leonard Percival Browne held the licence. By the time of this move Standley was in poor health and had wanted to retire in January 1929, her 60th birthday, but  was convinced to remain until a suitable replacement could be found. In the new, very poor living conditions at Jay Creek (where she spent a summer living in a tent), her health deteriorated and she was experiencing serious heart problems and she was finally able to retire.

Ida was made a member of the Order of the British Empire (MBE) in November 1929 for her services

Later life 

Ida Standley died on 29 May 1948 at Manly in Sydney and was buried, with catholic rites, at Frenchs Forest.

Legacy 

Ida is remembered for her hard work, efficiency, compassion and the affection she conveyed for the children in her care; many of whom called her 'Mum'.

The following places in Alice Springs and surrounds are named after her:

 Standley Chasm
 Ida Standley Preschool  
 Standley Crescent
 Ida Street

References 

Australian schoolteachers
Australian Members of the Order of the British Empire
1869 births
1948 deaths
19th-century Australian women
20th-century Australian women